Lambadina is a 2015 Ethiopian drama film produced and directed by Messay Getahun. It was screened at the 2016 edition of the Pan African Film Festival in Los Angeles, California. The film received the Audience Award for Narrative Feature, as well as, Special Jury Recognition-Director for First Feature Narrative. The film also won the award for Best Film by an African Living Abroad at the 12th Africa Movie Academy Awards.

Cast
 Tsion Mekonen
 Bersu Samson
 Addis Kidane
 Michael Yimesgen
 Yosef Ewnetu
 Messay Getahun
 Eyuel Berhanu

References

External links

2015 films
Ethiopian drama films
Best Film by an African Living Abroad Africa Movie Academy Award winners
2015 drama films